The Ganigobis Formation is a Late Carboniferous (Gzhelian) to Early Permian (Artinskian) geologic formation of the Dwyka Group in the ǁKaras Region of southeastern Namibia and the Northern Cape of South Africa. The widespread formation was deposited in the Aranos and Karoo Basins of southern Africa.

Description 
The Ganigobis Formation is an extensive unit with a maximum thickness of  evidenced in the Vreda borehole. The conglomerates, sandstones, shales and tuff of the formation were deposited in a glacio-lacustrine to marine environment. The Ganigobis Formation provides fossil fish as well as bivalves (e.g. Nuculopsis), gastropods (e.g. Peruvispira), scyphozoa (e.g. Conularia), crinoid stalks, foraminifera (Hyperammina, Ammodiscus, Glomospira, Ammobacculites and Spiroplectammina), sponges and sponge spicules, radiolaria, coprolites and permineralised wood.

Zircons of the Ganigobis Shale Member yield SHRIMP-ages of 302-300 Ma. This dates the uppermost part of the second deglaciation sequence in southern Namibia to the
Late Carboniferous (Gzelian) and provides a minimum age for the onset of Karoo-equivalent marine deposition. The age of the uppermost argillaceous part of the third deglaciation sequence (297 Ma) was determined from zircons of a tuffaceous bed sampled in a roadcut in the Western Cape Province, South Africa.

Fossil content 
Among others, the following fossils are reported from the formation:

Fish
 Acrolepis addamsi
 Namaichthys schroederi
 Watsonichthys lotzi

See also 
 List of fossiliferous stratigraphic units in Namibia
 List of fossiliferous stratigraphic units in South Africa
 Geology of Namibia
 Geology of South Africa
 Irati Formation

References

Bibliography

Further reading 
 B. G. Gardiner. 1962. Namaichthys schroederi Gürich and other Palaeozoic Fishes from South Africa. Palaeontology 5(1):9-21

Geologic formations of Namibia
Geologic formations of South Africa
Carboniferous System of Africa
Permian System of Africa
Carboniferous South Africa
Permian South Africa
Artinskian Stage
Gzhelian
Shale formations
Conglomerate formations
Sandstone formations
Tuff formations
Glacial deposits
Lacustrine deposits
Shallow marine deposits
Carboniferous southern paleotemperate deposits
Permian southern paleotemperate deposits
Paleontology in Namibia
Paleontology in South Africa
Geography of ǁKaras Region
Geography of the Northern Cape
Karoo